The Hawk-class of fast patrol craft is in service with the Royal Naval Force of Jordan. The ships were built by British shipbuilder Vosper Thornycroft (now BAE Systems Surface Ships).

References

Patrol boat classes